{{DISPLAYTITLE:C3H5ClO}}
The molecular formula C3H5ClO (molar mass: 92.52 g/mol, exact mass: 92.0029 u) may refer to:

 Chloroacetone, a colourless liquid with a pungent odour
 Epichlorohydrin, an organochlorine compound and an epoxide